Jamie Little (born April 9, 1978) is an American pit reporter for NASCAR coverage on Fox. Little is a former pit reporter for ESPN/ABC coverage of the Indy Racing League, although she returned to her pit reporting duty for the 2007 and 2008 Indianapolis 500 as well as the 2013 Firestone 550, and NASCAR on ESPN. Little joined ESPN in 1998 and covered both the Winter and Summer X Games. She is well known among the motocross and extreme sports community for being a pit reporter on ESPN's Motoworld program. Little won the 2008 Toyota Pro/Celebrity Race, edging out Craftsman Truck Series champion Mike Skinner by 0.324 seconds.

Little returned to the Winter X Games in January 2010, covering the Snowmobile Motocross. She also returned to her hosting duties for ESPN's second annual New Years, No Limits special on New Year's Eve.

On September 25, 2014, it was announced that Little would move to Fox Sports beginning in January 2015 to serve as a pit reporter for NASCAR Cup Series,  Xfinity Series and Camping World Truck Series races.

In 2021, Little began serving as the lead play-by-play announcer for Fox Sports' coverage of the ARCA Menards Series. She is the first woman to be the lead television play-by-play announcer for a national motorsports series.

Personal life
Little is a 2001 graduate of San Diego State University. Attended Greenspun Junior High School and graduated 8th grade in 1992. Attended Green Valley High School.

In December 2010, Little married Cody Selman in La Jolla, California. On August 9, 2012, she gave birth to a boy, Carter Wayne Selman. On October 24, 2016, Jamie and Cody welcomed Sierra Lynn Selman, the couple's 2nd born child.

Selman & Little own two Jimmy John's franchises in Las Vegas.

Little and her family live in Carmel, Indiana.

References

1978 births
American television sports announcers
Living people
Motorsport announcers
People from the Las Vegas Valley
San Diego State University alumni
Women sports announcers